Lewis and Clark and George is a 1997 comedy crime thriller film directed by Rod McCall.

Plot
Lewis and Clark and George opens with Salvator Xuereb (playing Lewis) and Dan Gunther (Clark) at a water tank site wearing prison jump suits. The scene is desert scrub and the two state prison escapees have just located a buried metal box with a loaded revolver, treasure map, and Cuban cigars. A road trip begins as the two hike off through the desert to find the treasure, eventually joined by Rose McGowan (George).

Cast
After Lewis, Clark, and George, the rest of the cast includes:
Aki Aleong as Chang
Paul Bartel as police officer
E. E. Bell as postal worker
James Brolin as preacher
Richard Butterfield as local
Tamara Chatterbuck as prostitute
Destiny Esposito as illiterate gun dealer
Jerry Gardner as Ford pickup driver
Jane as the dog
Art La Fleur as Fred – the bowling guy
Suzanne Mari as Nefertiti the prostitute
Corrinne Michaels as tourist
Delana Michaels as tourist
Ruben Moreno as Jane's sidekick
Paula Sorge as illiterate mom Tamee
Holly Riddle as Betty sitting on curb in front of Furr's
Brian Taylor as George's boyfriend

External links

 

1996 films
1990s crime comedy films
American crime comedy films
Sierra County, New Mexico
1990s road movies
American road movies
Films shot in New Mexico
1996 comedy films
1997 comedy films
1997 films
1990s English-language films
1990s American films